Love Story in Harvard is a 2004 South Korean television series starring Kim Rae-won, Kim Tae-hee and Lee Jung-jin. It aired on SBS from November 22, 2004 to January 11, 2005 on Mondays and Tuesdays at 21:55 for 16 episodes.

Synopsis 
The first half of the series is set at Harvard University and is mainly concerned with the burgeoning relationship between a Harvard Law School student, Kim Hyun-woo (Kim Rae-won), and a Harvard Medical School student, Lee Soo-in (Kim Tae-hee).

Kim Hyun-woo and Alex Hong (Lee Jung-jin) are two first-year students at Harvard Law School, both from South Korea. Alex applies himself more and as such is the favorite of Professor John H. Keynes (Frank Gorshin). Hyun-woo, who initially has a hard time adjusting to the workload, falls into the bad graces of the professor, who repeatedly humiliates or ignores him. However, Hyun-woo perseveres and eventually wins the respect of Professor Keynes and his classmates. Both men meet and fall for Lee Soo-in, a third-year Korean student at Harvard Medical School. This intensifies the rivalry between them.

Hyun-woo and Soo-in grow closer and eventually start dating. However, their relationship is short-lived as Soo-in's application to join OEP, an organization that provides medical care to patients in Third World countries, is accepted. After spending a night together, Soo-in breaks off all contact with Hyun-woo and leaves to work in South America, leaving him devastated.

The second half of the story takes place mainly in Seoul, after Hyun-woo and Alex have graduated from Harvard Law School. Hyun-woo is now an idealistic lawyer, refusing to take on lucrative corporate cases and only defending people he feels have no voice in the legal system. Alex, who remained in the US after graduation, returns to Korea to take on a case for an international chemicals company, which is being accused of dumping toxic substances. Hyun-woo becomes involved in the same case, although on the side of the victims demanding compensation. In addition, Soo-in also returns to Korea at around the same time to conduct some medical research. Unknown to her at first, the research is related to the chemicals case that Alex and Hyun-woo are both working on, and predictably the three meet up again.

Although Hyun-woo is still angry at Soo-in for leaving him so abruptly, he still has feelings for her, so does Alex.

Cast

Main  
 Kim Rae-won as Kim Hyun-woo - 1st year law student
 Kim Tae-hee as Lee Soo-in - 3rd year medical student
 Lee Jung-jin as Hong Jung-min/Alex Hong
 Kim Min as Yoo Jin-ah

Supporting  
 Kang Nam-gil as Oh Young-jae (law professor)
 Jung Sol-hee as Han Seul-gi
 Frank Gorshin as Professor John H. Keynes
 Seo Ji-hee as Chun Da-woon
 Lee Charm as Jason Walker
 Ben Wells as Ricky Don (Jung-min's friend)
 Joo Hyun as Lee Yong-goo (Soo-in's father)
 Kim Chang-wan as Soo-in's doctor
 Lee Seung-hyung as Jason Walker's lawyer

Production 
Although the drama is set at Harvard University, it was filmed at the University of Southern California and UCLA.

Ratings

Source: TNS Media Korea

References

External links
  
 Love Story in Harvard at SBS Global
 
 

Harvard University in fiction
Seoul Broadcasting System television dramas
2004 South Korean television series debuts
2005 South Korean television series endings
Korean-language television shows
South Korean romance television series
Television shows written by Choi Wan-kyu
Television shows set in Boston
Television shows set in South Korea
Television series by JS Pictures
Television series by Logos Film